Kodava may refer to:
Kodava people
Kodava language
Kodava maaple, a Muslim community in Karnataka, India

Language and nationality disambiguation pages